Kırıkkale YHT railway station, short for Kırıkkale Yüksek Hızlı Tren railway station, is a railway station located just north of Kırıkkale, Turkey, that is under construction. The station is located along the D.200 highway on the northern perimeter of the city, and will service high-speed trains along the Ankara–Sivas high-speed railway.

Kırıkkale YHT station will become the second railway station in Kırıkkale, together with Kırıkkale station, which is serviced by conventional trains. The YHT stands for HSR or High-speed railway.

External links
Ankara-Sivas high-speed railway project 

Railway stations in Kırıkkale Province
Buildings and structures in Kırıkkale Province
High-speed railway stations in Turkey
Railway stations under construction in Turkey
Transport in Kırıkkale Province